Pharsalia mortalis is a species of beetle in the family Cerambycidae. It was described by James Thomson in 1857.

References

mortalis
Beetles described in 1857